Tobot (Korean: 변신자동차 또봇, RR: Byeonsinjadongcha Ttobot) is a South Korean animated television series produced by Young Toys and Retrobot. The series features transforming cars — some of which are designed after Kia vehicles.

The series is available in Korean and English on Young Toys' official YouTube channel. The toy line beat Lego as South Korea's most popular toy line in 2013.

An official English dub was produced in Canada by Ocean Productions and its sister studio Blue Water Studios, airing over a few months in 2018. This version is currently available on Netflix.

A spinoff series known as Athlon Tobot aired in three seasons from 2016-2017, before getting rebooted in 2018 as Tobot V (in English dub version known as Tobot: Galaxy Detectives), with animation done by Studio Button, the same company that made Power Battle Watch Car instead of Retrobot. Like the original, Galaxy Detectives is also available on Netflix. Tobot V lasted for three and a half seasons from 2018 to 2022, and a new reboot based more closely on the original series is set to release in 2023. Retrobot once again animates for the series.

Plot

Original version
While investigating a string of mysterious car accidents, Dr. Franklin Char is abducted by the perpetrators. This incident activates his creations called "Tobots", cars that transform into robots with a special key called a "Tokey". Dr. Char's first two Tobots, Tobot X and Tobot Y, are entrusted to his twin sons Ryan and Kory, respectively, to fight crime and protect their neighborhood.

Season 1 (unmanned airing date: April 2010) 
The first start of Tobot. Twin sons, Ryan and Kory's father, Dr. Franklin Char, was kidnapped. Will Ryan and Kory be able to save Dr. Char with Tobots, X and Y?

Season 2 (Combined Tobot Titans, Aired date; September 2010) 
The first appearance of Tobot Titan, the intergration of X and Y. Will Titan be able to keep Deado City at peace?

Season 3 (Another Tobot, Aired date; March 2011) 
The first appearance of Tobot Z and pilot Dylan Kwon. A fight breaks out between Ryan, Kory, and Dylan, who need to work together, and Titan's energy needs to be recharged. Can the boys save Tobot X, Y, and Z and keep the peace and safety of the big city?

Season 4 (The strongest united Tritan, Aired date; September 2011) 
Tobot's pilots Ryan, Kory, and Dylan, promised to join forces, and Dr. Char completed Tritan. In a situation where Titan is framed, can Ryan Dolly, Kory, and Dylan, defeat the Titan's counterfeit robot, Zaritan, and keep the peace and safety of the big city?

Season 5 (Tritan Super Combo, Aired date; November 2011) 
Tritan was unable to keep the metropolis forever, and he met Professor Noh to become more powerful. Tritan's super combo must match the hearts and minds of Ryan, Kory, and Dylan succeed in the Tritan Super Combo?

Season 6 (Start of Evolution, Aired date; March 2012) 
Tobot X, Y Evolution Form Tobot X, Y Evolution is complete and Neon's first appearance. Neon is said to be a delivery man, but he has something suspicious. What is his secret?

Season 7 (Fly Tobot, Aired date; July 2012) 
Ryan, Kory, Dylan, and Nathan, who completed the new Tobot Tobot W. Who will be the pilot of Tobot W?

One day, when the tobots were living normally, a Raven similar to a Crow appeared. The Crow is actually Hades Raven and he revived. And the seal of being trapped by The gods. Can Victor and the Tobots find the happiness of Athena,
Tobot magma Cerberus, Blizzard dragon, astral Phoenix, and Maximus V become one, vow to protect the universe, and fight hades raven. Can Magma Cerberus, Blizzard dragon, Astral Phoenix, and Maximus V be able to keep the peace in the universe?

Production

Young Toys came up with the idea of developing an animated series and related toys during the early 2000s. While Transformers and Power Rangers are popular among older elementary school children, Young Toys decided to market Tobot to younger primary school children and kindergarteners. Rather than obtain licenses from animation studios after production, Young Toys did the opposite by developing the animated series and characters from scratch before producing the toys.

Marketing
Between August and October 2014, Young Toys sold the licenses for the Tobot toys and characters to Southeast Asian nations. The series was made available in some Middle Eastern countries in January 2015.

In December 2014, Young Toys erected an eight-meter, three ton statue of Deltatron at the Sky Park outside Seoul's Lotte Mall Gimpo International Airport shopping complex to commemorate the fifth anniversary of Tobot. The statue was on display until 2019.

References

External links 
 

2010 South Korean television series debuts
2010s South Korean animated television series
South Korean children's animated action television series
South Korean children's animated adventure television series
South Korean children's animated science fiction television series
Computer-animated television series
Fictional robots
Animated television series about children
Animated television series about robots
Transforming toy robots